Jesper Bengtsson (born 2 September 1971) is a retired Swedish football midfielder.

References

1971 births
Living people
Swedish footballers
Falkenbergs FF players
IF Elfsborg players
Association football midfielders
Allsvenskan players